Titiwangsa may refer to:

 Titiwangsa
 Titiwangsa (federal constituency), represented in the Dewan Rakyat
 Titiwangsa Lake Park, a park in Kuala Lumpur, Malaysia
 Titiwangsa Mountains, a mountain range in Peninsular Malaysia
 Titiwangsa station, a metro station in Kuala Lumpur, Malaysia